The 2010 Singapore Open Super Series is a top level badminton  competition which was held from June 15, 2010 to June 20, 2010 in Singapore. It is the fifth BWF Super Series competition on the 2010 BWF Super Series schedule. The total purse for the event is $200,000.

Men's singles

Seeds

 Lee Chong Wei
 Peter Gade
 Nguyễn Tiến Minh
 Boonsak Ponsana
 Jan Ø. Jørgensen
 Simon Santoso
 Sony Dwi Kuncoro
 Kenichi Tago

Results

Women's singles

Seeds

 Saina Nehwal
 Tine Rasmussen
 Zhou Mi
 Lu Lan
 Eriko Hirose
 Yao Jie
 Bae Seung-hee
 Yip Pui Yin

Results

Men's doubles

Seeds

 Koo Kien Keat / Tan Boon Heong
 Markis Kido / Hendra Setiawan
 Mathias Boe / Carsten Mogensen
 Lars Påske / Jonas Rasmussen
 Hendra Aprida Gunawan / Alvent Yulianto
 Chen Hung-ling / Lin Yu-lang
 Choong Tan Fook / Lee Wan Wah
 Howard Bach / Tony Gunawan

Results

Women's doubles

Seeds

 Miyuki Maeda / Satoko Suetsuna
 Mizuki Fujii / Reika Kakiiwa
 Petya Nedelcheva /  Anastasia Russkikh
 Cheng Wen-hsing / Chien Yu-chin
 Kim Min-jung / Lee Hyo-jung
 Savitree Amitapai / Vacharaporn Munkit
 Ha Jung-eun / Jung Kyung-eun
 Laura Choinet / Weny Rasidi

Results

Mixed doubles

Seeds

 Nova Widianto / Liliyana Natsir
 Thomas Laybourn / Kamilla Rytter Juhl
 Hendra Aprida Gunawan / Vita Marissa
 Robert Mateusiak / Nadieżda Zięba
 Songphon Anugritayawon / Kunchala Voravichitchaikul
 Valiyaveetil Diju / Jwala Gutta
 Shin Baek-cheol / Lee Hyo-jung
 Nathan Robertson / Jenny Wallwork

Results

References

External links
Singapore Open Super Series 2010 at tournamentsoftware.com

 
Singapore